This is the discography for American singer-songwriter M. Ward.

Solo work

Albums

EPs 
 Scene from No. 12 (I Ain't Sleeping) (2000)
 To Go Home (2007)

Singles

With other artists

Arizona Amp and Alternator 
 Arizona Amp and Alternator (2005)

She & Him

Monsters of Folk 
 Monsters of Folk (2009) (#15 U.S.)

Tired Pony 
 The Place We Ran From (2010)

Compilation tracks 
 "John King's Watercolor Bicycle" on Acuarela Songs 1 (2001, Acuarela)
 "Fearless" on Merge Records Presents: Survive and Advance Vol. 3 (2003, Merge)
 "Story of an Artist" (Daniel Johnston) on The Late Great Daniel Johnston: Discovered Covered (2004, Gammon)
 "One More Goodbye" on Old Enough 2 Know Better: 15 Years of Merge Records (2004, Merge)
 "Let My Love Open the Door" (Pete Townshend) on Sweetheart 2005: Love Songs (2005, Hear)
 "Green River" (Creedence Clearwater Revival) on Green River: Benefit For Mercy Corps (2005, Merge)
 "Bean Vine Blues #2" (John Fahey) on I Am the Resurrection: A Tribute to John Fahey (2006, Vanguard)
 "What Is a Soul?" on Big Change: Songs for FINCA (2007, IODA)
 "Let's Dance" on Sounds Eclectic: The Covers Project (2007, Hear)
 "Crooked Lines" on The Hottest State (Original Motion Picture Soundtrack) (2007, Sony/ATV)

Other appearances 
 The Band of Blacky Ranchette – Still Lookin' Good to Me (2003, Thrill Jockey)
 My Morning Jacket – Z – Into The Woods  (2005, ATO)
 Jenny Lewis & The Watson Twins – Rabbit Fur Coat (2006, Team Love)
 Bright Eyes – Four Winds (2007, Saddle Creek)
 Bright Eyes – Cassadaga (2007, Saddle Creek)
 Jenny Lewis – Acid Tongue (2008, Reprise)
 Jolie Holland – The Living and the Dead (2008, Anti Records)
 Alain Bashung – Bleu pétrole (2008, Barclay Records)
 Eli Stone – season one, episode two
 The Go-Getter
 Por Vida: A Tribute to the Songs of Alejandro Escovedo
 The Late Great Daniel Johnston: Discovered Covered (2004, Gammon Records)
 Eyes on the Prize – with Janne Schra on Janne Schra (2013, Universal Music)

References 

Discographies of American artists